James Thomas Stevens (born 1966) is an American poet and academic. He is a member of the Akwesasne Mohawk Nation and currently teaches at the Institute of American Indian Arts in Santa Fe, New Mexico.

Background
James Thomas Stevens was born in Niagara Falls, New York, and his Mohawk name is Aronhió:ta's. His father was a Welsh-American and his mother is Mohawk.

Education
In 1993 Stevens earned his MFA in writing from Brown University Graduate Writing Program, where he had a full fellowship. He earned a Creative Writing AFA from the Institute of American Indian Arts, where he received the Gerald Red Elk Scholarship in 1990, allowing him to attend the Naropa Institute Summer Writing Program. Stevens briefly attended the School of Visual Arts and Brooklyn College in New York.

Academic and writing career
Stevens was an associate professor in the English Department of SUNY Fredonia and the director of American Indian Studies. He has also been an Instructor of Poetry at Brown University and taught at Haskell Indian Nations University.

He is an author of numerous volumes of poetry. An international poet with professional invitations to France, Turkey, and China, Stevens spoke at the IIPF in the United Nations in 2006. He formerly taught at Haskell Indian Nations University and remains a vibrant member of the Native community as well as a leading young American Poet.

Awards and nominations
 1991 Institute of American Indian Arts Creative Writing Award
 1993 Kim Ann Arstark Memorial Prize in Poetry
 1993 Wittner-Bynner Foundation Poetry Grant
 1994 City of Santa Fe Writer's Award
 1996 Pushcart Prize Nomination 
 2000 Whiting Award
 2003 Nominated for a Before Columbus/American Book Award
 2005 Finalist for the National Poetry Series Award

Published books
 
 
 
 
  (with Caroline Sinavaiana)

Notes

References
 Glancy, Diane and Mark Nowak. Visit Teepee Town: Native Writings After the Detours. Coffee House Press.

External links
NativeWiki Entry
Stevens' profile on the Native American Authors Project
Stevens' profile at Salt Publishing
Profile at The Whiting Foundation

1966 births
Living people
American male poets
Native American academics
Brown University alumni
Institute of American Indian Arts alumni
Institute of American Indian Arts faculty
People from Niagara Falls, New York
Native American writers
21st-century American poets
American people of Welsh descent
Brooklyn College alumni
21st-century American male writers